The Silurian hypothesis is a thought experiment which assesses modern science's ability to detect evidence of a prior advanced civilization, perhaps several million years ago. The name "Silurian" derives from the eponymous sentient species from the BBC science fiction series Doctor Who, who in the series established an advanced civilization prior to humanity.

Explanation
The idea was presented in a 2018 paper by Adam Frank, an astrophysicist at the University of Rochester, and Gavin Schmidt, director of the Goddard Institute for Space Studies. Frank and Schmidt imagined an advanced civilization before humans and pondered whether it would "be possible to detect an industrial civilization in the geological record". They argue as early as the Carboniferous era (~350 million years ago) "there has been sufficient fossil carbon to fuel an industrial civilization comparable with our own". However, they also wrote: "While we strongly doubt that any previous industrial civilization existed before our own, asking the question in a formal way that articulates explicitly what evidence for such a civilization might look like raises its own useful questions related both to astrobiology and to Anthropocene studies." The term "Silurian hypothesis" was inspired by the fictional species called the Silurians from the British television series Doctor Who.

According to Frank and Schmidt, since fossilization is relatively rare and little of Earth's exposed surface is from before the Quaternary time period (~2.5 million years ago), there is low probability of finding direct evidence of such a civilization, such as technological artifacts. After a great time span, the researchers concluded, contemporary humans would be more likely to find indirect evidence such as rapid changes in temperature or climate (as occurred during the Paleocene–Eocene Thermal Maximum ~55 million years ago); evidence of tapping geothermal power sources; or anomalies in sediment such as their chemical composition (e.g., evidence of artificial fertilizers) or isotope ratios (e.g., there is no naturally occurring plutonium-244 outside a supernova, so evidence of this isotope could indicate a technologically advanced civilization). Objects that could indicate possible evidence of past civilizations include plastics and nuclear wastes residues buried deep underground or on the ocean floor.

Frank and Schmidt speculate such a civilization could have gone to space and left artifacts on other celestial bodies, such as the Moon and Mars. Evidence for artifacts on these two worlds would be easier to find than on Earth, where erosion and tectonic activity would erase much of it.

Frank first approached Schmidt to discuss how to detect alien civilizations via their potential impact upon climate through the study of ice cores and tree rings. They both realized that the hypothesis could be expanded and applied to Earth and humanity due to the fact that humans have been in their current form for the past 300,000 years and have had sophisticated technology for only the last few centuries.

In popular culture 
Frank and Schmidt cite Inherit the Stars, a 1977 novel by James P. Hogan as containing a similar hypothesis, but also say they were surprised by how rarely the concept was explored in science fiction.

The Silurians on Doctor Who are a race of reptilian humanoids from Earth's past. 

Andre Norton's The Time Traders (1958) and later books in the series discussed the idea that most physical evidence of ancient advanced civilizations on Earth could be removed in mere millennia by glaciers, volcanic eruptions and decay.

The Star Trek Voyager episode "Distant Origin" has the crew encounter the Voth, a spacefaring race that may have evolved on Earth from dinosaurs. When discussing this theory with a Voth scientist, Chakotay speculates that their ancestors evolved on an isolated continent that was destroyed by cataclysm, with all traces buried under oceans or kilometers of rock.

The idea of pre-human civilizations is explored in the H.P. Lovecraft novelette "The Shadow out of Time".

In Larry Niven's short story The Green Marauder, an alien over 700 million years old (due to relativistic travel) tells a human about the last time it visited Earth, and the hopeless plea from Earth's anaerobic civilization for help against the growing environmental threat of chlorophyll.

See also 

 Ancient astronauts
 Gap creationism
 Out-of-place artifact
 Permian–Triassic extinction event
 The World Without Us
 Xenoarchaeology

References

Further reading 
 

Hypotheses
Thought experiments
2018 introductions
Astrobiology
Extinction
Paleontological concepts and hypotheses